Vincenz Kollar (15 January 1797 in Kranowitz, Silesia – 30 May 1860 in Vienna) was an Austrian entomologist who specialised in Diptera. He was especially concerned with species of economic interest, particularly those of forests. Kollar described many new species. He was Curator of the Natural History Museum in Vienna. He worked mainly on insects collected on expeditions, especially that from the Austrian Brazil Expedition of 1817–1835.

Works

Die vorzüglich lästigen Insekten Brasiliens, p. 101-119. In J.E. Pohl. Reise im Innern von Brasiliens, vol. I, 448p.(1832)
 Aufzählung und Beschreibung der von Freih. Carl v. Hügel auf seiner Reise durch Kaschmir und das Himalayagebirge gesammelten Insekten. (mit L. Redtenbacher). 4(2):393-564, 582–585, 28 colour plates (1848).
Über Agrilus viridis Kiesw. ein die Erlen verwüstendes Insekt. Verhandlungen der Zoologische-botanische Geselschaft, Wien 8:325-328.(1858)

References 
 https://web.archive.org/web/20060724190615/http://www.zalf.de/home_zalf/institute/dei/php/biograph/biograph.php

Austrian lepidopterists
Austrian taxonomists
 01
1797 births
1860 deaths
Dipterists
Austrian people of German descent
People from Austrian Silesia
People from Racibórz County
19th-century Austrian zoologists